'The Motor' International Six Hour Saloon Car Race   was the third round of the 1963 European Touring Car Challenge, and was held at Brands Hatch on the Grand Prix circuit, on 6 July.

This, the second Motor-sponsored Six-Hour saloon car race, was run in appalling conditions, like the 1962 event. The large crowd of approximately 15000, witnessed the favourite, a 7-litre Ford Galaxie driven by Dan Gurney and Jack Brabham flounder in the wet and the Jaguar Mk II dominate the race. Victory went to Roy Salvadori and Denny Hulme from Peter Lindner and Peter Nöcker after the winners on the road, Mike Salmon and Pete Sutcliffe, were disqualified for engine irregularities.

Report

Entry
A fine entry of 39 cars were accepted for the event, across five classes. However, scrutineering meant trouble for those Ford Galaxies which had disc brakes; Gawaine Baillie was only allowed to start the meeting on the promise of photographic evidence of the brake mounting – otherwise he would be disqualified. John Willment Automobiles  was not prepared for this and withdrew their Galaxie.  Of the cars accepted, 37 cars practised.

Qualifying
Grid positions were determined by engine capacity rather than practice times. As a result, the record books show John Sprinzel on pole, in his 7-litre Ford Galaxie.  However, the fastest time in practise was set by the pairing of Dan Gurney and Jack Brabham in their Galaxie.

Race
The start with the slow car of John Sprinzel on pole, brought Mike Salmon into second place in Jaguar Mk. II following the early leader, Gawaine Baillie’s Galaxie, ahead of the American Dan Gurney (Galaxie) and John Coundley (Jaguar Mk II). Handicapped by wrong tyres, Gurney spun at South Bank, but somehow the whole field avoided him. After two laps, Baillie had dropped to third, giving way to Salmon and Peter Lindner, while Gurney spun again.  By the fourth lap, Gurney came in for a tyre change on the rear – before the start, he could only change the fronts.

The terrible conditions made for an interesting race; Lindner nearly lost his Jaguar Mk. II, and he was not the only one. Albert Powell hit a bank, but continued after repairs, and Mick Clare rolled his Mini. After the pit stops, at the three-hour mark, the leaders were Roy Salvadori, Salmon, Lindner (all Jaguars), Jack Sears, Jimmy Blumer (both in Cortinas with Tom Trana in sixth, in his Volvo. The quick pit stop of the Atherstone Engineering Jaguar moved Salmon  into the lead, its lead now over a lap. Salvadori/Denny Hulme were second, Sears fourth and Lindner/Peter Höcker fifth.

At 8:30pm, six hours after the race started and 166 laps of the Grand Prix circuit, the chequered flag dropped and the pairing of Salmon/Pete Sutcliffe won the race, with Salvadori/Hulme second, Lindner/Höcker completing the podium, just ahead of Sears/Bo Ljungfeldt with Trana/Carl-Magnus Skogh fifth. Once again scrutineering revealed problems for the winner: the Jaguar Mk. II was disqualified for having oversized inlet valves. The winner’s average speed was published as 73.477mph.

Classification

The Motor 6 hours

Class Winners are in Bold text. Please note that race winner, was not declared class winner.

 Fastest lap: Denny Hulme, 2:04.000secs. (77.375 mph)

Class Winners

Standings after the race

Note: Only the top five positions are included in this set of standings.
Championship points were awarded for the first seven places in each race in the order of 12-10-8-7-5-6-4.

References

Brands Hatch
Brands Hatch 6 Hours
Brands Hatch